Hindustan Shipyard Limited (HSL) is a shipyard located in Visakhapatnam on the east coast of India.

History

Founded as the Scindia Shipyard, it was built by industrialist Walchand Hirachand as a part of The Scindia Steam Navigation Company Ltd. Walchand selected Visakhapatnam as a suitable location for the construction of the yard and took possession of the land in November 1940. The foundation stone for the shipyard was laid by Dr. Rajendra Prasad on 21 June 1941, who was at that time the acting Congress President.

The first ship to be constructed fully in India after independence was built at the Scindia Shipyard and named Jal Usha. It was launched in 1948 by Jawaharlal Nehru at a ceremony where the families of Seth Walchand Hirachnd, late Narottam Morarjee, and Tulsidas Kilachand, the partners of Scindia Shipyard, were present along with other dignitaries and industrialists.

Walchand died in 1953, and the Scindia Shipyard continued to operate successfully under the next of kin of the founders. However, in 1961 the shipyard was nationalised and renamed Hindustan Shipyard Limited (HSL).

In 2010, HSL was transferred from the Ministry of Shipping to the Ministry of Defence. The yard played a critical role in the development of the nuclear-powered Arihant class submarine.

In 2022, Hindustan Shipyard Limited registers highest value of production in its history. the value of production from shipbuilding remained at Rs 613 crore marking it as the highest value of production recorded from shipbuilding division in the history of the shipyard.

Facilities
It is equipped with the plasma cutting machines, steel processing and welding facilities, material handling equipment, cranes, logistics and storage facilities. It also has testing and measuring facilities.

It has a covered building dock for building vessels up to 80,000 DWT. There are three slipways and a  fitting-out jetty.

HSL has a dry dock, wet basin and repair delphin for ship and submarine repair and retrofitting.

Vessels
By 2009, over 192 vessels had been built at HSL through 2009 and the shipyard had repaired almost 2000 ships. It builds bulk carriers, offshore patrol vessels, survey ships, drill ships, offshore platforms and repair and support vessels.

It also conducts major overhauls of Indian Navy submarines, and is being equipped to construct nuclear-powered submarines. However, the shipyard has a history of protracted refits. The submarines Vela, Vagli, and Sindhukirti each spent almost 10 years for a single refit at HSL. Where a Russian shipyard would deploy 200 workers in three shifts to complete the refit in two years, HSL deployed only 50 workers to work on Sindhukirti.

References

External links

Website

Shipyards of India
Shipbuilding companies of India
Government-owned companies of India
Companies based in Visakhapatnam
Companies nationalised by the Government of India
Vehicle manufacturing companies established in 1941
Economy of Visakhapatnam
Walchand Group
Indian companies established in 1941